Ray Rigby (11 June 1949 – 1 August 1998) was an Australian shot putter and weightlifter who competed in the 1968 Summer Olympics.

References

1949 births
1998 deaths
Australian male weightlifters
Australian male shot putters
Olympic weightlifters of Australia
Weightlifters at the 1968 Summer Olympics
Weightlifters at the 1970 British Commonwealth Games
Athletes (track and field) at the 1974 British Commonwealth Games
Commonwealth Games medallists in weightlifting
Commonwealth Games gold medallists for Australia
20th-century Australian people
Medallists at the 1970 British Commonwealth Games